Zosichrysia is a genus or subgenus of moths of the family Noctuidae. It is sometimes treated as a subgenus of Diachrysia. According to Beck, it should be treated as a valid genus.

References
Natural History Museum Lepidoptera genus database

Plusiinae